Zhang Yunlong (born 2 March 1988), also known as Leon or Jack Zhang, is a Chinese actor.

Career
Zhang Yunlong made his debut in the theater play, Thunderstorm, and acted in several short films. In 2012, Zhang won the Best Actor award at the Beijing Student Original Film Competition for his performance in Love Express. 

In 2013, after graduating from Beijing Film Academy, he was chosen by Yang Mi to star in her self-produced series, V Love. The same year, he featured in the hit fantasy action drama Swords of Legends. He continued to appear in small but notable supporting roles in the dramas Destined to Love You and The Interpreter and the film Forever Young. 

In 2016, he headlined his first drama, animal-themed romance series Hero Dog 2; followed by sci-fi romance drama Special Beautiful Man. 

In 2017, he starred in the romance film Mr. Pride vs Miss Prejudice, and won the Best Chivalry award at the China Britain Film Festival for his performance.  The same year, he headlined the fantasy action drama Xuan-Yuan Sword: Han Cloud; as well as featured in the Disney-made romantic comedy film The Dreaming Man.

In 2019, Zhang starred in the fantasy science fiction drama My Poseidon, and workplace romance drama In Youth. The same year, he starred in the police film S.W.A.T.. 

In 2020, Zhang starred in the republican detective drama My Roommate is a Detective as a former gangster who becomes a police officer. Zhang received positive reviews for his performance, as well as chemistry with co-star Hu Yitian; and gained wider popularity as a result.

In 2021, he joined the cast of Call Me By Fire as a contestant. He also returned for the second season of Call Me By Fire.

Filmography

Film

Television series

Variety and reality show

Discography

Awards and nominations

References

External links 
 

1988 births
Living people
21st-century Chinese male actors
Chinese male film actors
Chinese male television actors
Jay Walk Studio
Male actors from Dalian
Beijing Film Academy alumni